The 2020 New Zealand Athletics Championships was the national championship in outdoor track and field for New Zealand. It was held from 6–8 March at Ngā Puna Wai Sports Hub in Christchurch. The 10,000 metres was held separately on 21 March while the half marathon took place on 5 April.

Results

Men

Women

References

Results
 2020 Jennian Homes New Zealand Track & Field Championships Results. Athletics New Zealand. Retrieved 2020-11-26.

New Zealand Athletics Championships
New Zealand Athletics Championships
New Zealand Athletics Championships
New Zealand Athletics Championships
Sports competitions in Christchurch